A shopping center (American English) or shopping centre (Commonwealth English) or mall, also called a shopping complex, shopping arcade, shopping plaza or galleria, is a group of shops built together, sometimes under one roof.

The first known collections of retailers under one roof are public markets, dating back to ancient times, and Middle Eastern covered markets, bazaars and souqs. In Paris, about 150 covered passages were built between the late 18th century and 1850, and a wealth of shopping arcades were built across Europe in the 19th century. In the United States, the widespread use of the automobile in the 1920s led to the first shopping centers of a few dozen shops that included parking for cars. Starting in 1946, larger, open air centers anchored by department stores were built (sometimes as a collection of adjacent retail properties with different owners), then enclosed shopping malls starting with Victor Gruen's Southdale Center near Minneapolis in 1956.

A shopping mall is a type of shopping center, a North American term originally meaning a pedestrian promenade with shops along it, but in the late 1960s began to be used as a generic term for large shopping centers anchored by department stores, especially enclosed centers. Many malls are currently in severe decline ("dead malls") or have closed. Successful exceptions have added entertainment and experiential features, added big-box stores as anchor tenants, or are specialized formats: power centers, lifestyle centers, factory outlet centers, and festival marketplaces.  Smaller types of shopping centers in North America include neighborhood shopping centers, and even smaller, strip malls. Pedestrian malls (shopping streets) in the United States have been less common and less successful than in Europe. In Canada, underground passages in Montreal and Toronto link large adjacent downtown retail spaces.

In the United Kingdom and Europe, distinction is made between shopping centers (shops under one roof), shopping precincts (pedestrianized zones of a town or city where many retail stores are located), the "high street" (street – pedestrianized or not – with a high concentration of retail shops), and retail parks (usually out of the city center, 5000 sq.m. or larger and anchored by big-box stores or supermarkets, rather than department stores).

Types
According to author Richard Longstreth, before the 1920s–1930s, the term "shopping center" in the U.S. was loosely applied to any group of adjacent retail businesses. A city's downtown might be called a "shopping center". By the 1940s, the term "shopping center" implied — if not always a single owner — at least, a place sharing comprehensive design planning, including layout, signs, exterior lighting, and parking; and shared business planning that covered the target market, types of stores and store mix.

The International Council of Shopping Centers classifies Asia-Pacific, European, U.S., and Canadian shopping centers into the following types:

Abbreviations: SC=shopping center/centre, GLA = Gross Leasable Area, NLA = Net Leasable Area, AP=Asia-Pacific, EU=Europe, Can=Canada, US=United States of America
*does not apply to Europe

General-purpose shopping centers

Superregional mall / mega-mall

Note that ICSC defines malls above  net leasable area in Asia-Pacific as mega-malls.

Regional mall

A regional mall is, per the International Council of Shopping Centers, in the United States, a shopping mall which is designed to service a larger area than a conventional shopping mall. Given their wider service area, these malls tend to have higher-end stores that need a larger area in order for their services to be profitable but may have discount department stores. Regional malls are also found as tourist attractions in vacation areas.

Community shopping center

Community shopping centers (also known as large neighborhood centers offer a wider range of goods. They usually feature two anchor stores which are larger than that of a smaller neighborhood centers, e.g. a discount department store. They may also follow a strip configuration, or may be L- or U-shaped.

In the U.K. and Europe these would be considered retail parks.

Neighborhood center

Neighborhood centers are small-scale shopping centers serving the local neighborhood. They typically have a supermarket and/or large drugstore as an anchor.

In the U.K. and Europe such a center, if larger than  would usually be termed a small retail park.

Strip mall (convenience center)

Strip malls (which despite the name, are not considered "malls" even in North America) are sometimes known as strip centers or convenience centers.

Specialized shopping centers

Power centers and retail parks

Power centers, in North America, are open-air single-level shopping centers that almost exclusively feature several big-box retailers as their anchors (although newer urban power centers have adopted enclosed and/or vertical formats while retaining the strong big-box emphasis).

A retail park, in the United Kingdom and Europe, is a type of shopping centre found on the fringes of most large towns and cities in the United Kingdom, and some (but not all) other European countries. In Europe, any shopping center with mostly "retail warehouse units" (UK terminology; in the US the term is "big-box stores"/superstores),  or larger is a retail park, according to the leading real estate company Cushman & Wakefield. This would be considered in North America either a power center or a neighborhood shopping center, depending on the size.

Lifestyle center

A lifestyle center (American English), or lifestyle centre (Commonwealth English), is a shopping center or mixed-used commercial development that combines the traditional retail functions of a shopping mall with leisure amenities oriented towards upscale consumers.

Theme/festival center

Theme or festival centers have distinct unifying themes that are followed by their individual shops as well as their architecture. They are usually located in urban areas and cater to tourists.

Outlet center

An outlet center (or outlet mall in North America) is a type of shopping center in which manufacturers sell their products directly to the public through their own stores. Other stores in outlet centers are operated by retailers selling returned goods and discontinued products, often at heavily reduced prices. Outlet stores were found as early as 1936, but the first multi-store outlet center, Vanity Fair, located in Reading, Pennsylvania, did not open until 1974. Belz Enterprises opened the first enclosed factory outlet center in 1979, in Lakeland, Tennessee, a suburb of Memphis.

Shopping precinct / Pedestrian mall

A shopping precinct (U.K. term) or pedestrian mall (U.S. term) is an area of city center streets which have been pedestrianized, where there is a concentration of "high street shops" such as department stores, clothing and home furnishings stores, and so forth. They may be part of a larger city-center pedestrian zone, as is Strøget in Copenhagen, Denmark. In the U.S. chiefly in the 1960s, some cities converted a main shopping street (usually several blocks of one street only) to pedestrian zones known at the time as shopping malls (i.e. the original meaning of "mall": a "promenade"), but now referred to as pedestrian malls.

Shopping arcade

A shopping arcade is a type of shopping precinct that developed earlier and in which the connecting walkways are not owned by a single proprietor and may be in the open air or covered by a ground-floor loggia. Many early shopping arcades such as the Burlington Arcade in London, the Galleria Vittorio Emanuele II in Milan, and numerous arcades in Paris are famous and still functioning as shopping centers, while many others have been demolished. 

In Russia, centuries-old shopping centers the size of regional malls still operate, consisting of multiple arcades. They developed from previous so-called "trading rows", which were essentially markets where traders could obtain space to sell their goods. Great Gostiny Dvor in Saint Petersburg in its present buildings dates back to the 1760s.

In historical buildings

Historic and/or monumental buildings are sometimes converted into shopping centers, often forming part of a larger city center shopping district that otherwise consists mostly of on-street stores.

History

Shopping centers are not a recent innovation. One of the earliest examples of public shopping areas comes from ancient Rome, in forums where shopping markets were located. One of the earliest public shopping centers is Trajan's Market in Rome located in Trajan's Forum. Trajan's Market was probably built around 100–110 AD by Apollodorus of Damascus, and it is thought to be the world's oldest shopping center. The Grand Bazaar of Istanbul was built in the 15th century and is still one of the largest covered shopping centers in the world, with more than 58 streets and 4,000 shops. Numerous other covered shopping arcades, such as the 19th-century Al-Hamidiyah Souq in Damascus, Syria, might also be considered as precursors to the present-day large shopping centers. Isfahan's Grand Bazaar, which is largely covered, dates from the 10th century. The 10-kilometer-long, covered Tehran's Grand Bazaar also has a lengthy history. The oldest continuously occupied shopping mall in the world is likely to be the Chester Rows. Dating back at least to the 13th century, these covered walkways housed shops, with storage and accommodation for traders on various levels. Different rows specialized in different goods, such as 'Bakers Row' or 'Fleshmongers Row'.

The Marché des Enfants Rouges in Paris opened in 1628 and still runs today. The Oxford Covered Market in Oxford, England opened in 1774 and still runs today.

The Passage du Caire was opened in Paris in 1798. The Burlington Arcade in London was opened in 1819.
The Arcade in Providence, Rhode Island introduced the retail arcade concept to the United States in 1828 and is arguably the oldest "shopping center" in the country. The Galleria Vittorio Emanuele II in Milan, Italy followed in the 1870s and is closer to large modern malls in spaciousness. Other large cities created arcades and shopping centers in the late 19th century and early 20th century, including the Cleveland Arcade, and Moscow's GUM, which opened in 1890. When the Cleveland Arcade opened in 1890, it was among the first indoor shopping arcades in the US, and like its European counterparts, was an architectural triumph. Two sides of the arcade had 1,600 panes of glass set in iron framing and is a prime example of Victorian architecture. Sydney's Queen Victoria Markets Building, opened in 1898, was also an ambitious architectural project.

Shopping Centers built before the 20th century;

Modern shopping center milestones

Notes: *based on current ICSC shopping center type definitions, **center opened in 1926 without department store, which was added in 1930

United States

Early 20th century centers in the U.S.

Early examples of "stores under one roof" include the nine-building shopping arcade Dayton Arcade in Dayton, Ohio (1902–1904), primarily built to rehouse the public food markets in more sanitary conditions, but which added retail clothing and household goods stores. The Lake View Store, opened July 1916, was a collection of stores under one roof aimed at the workers in the company town of Morgan Park, in Duluth, Minnesota.

Before the 1920s–1930s, the term "shopping center" in the U.S. was loosely applies to a collection of retail businesses. A city's Downtown might be called a "shopping center". By the 1940s, "shopping center" implied — if not always a single owner — at least, comprehensive planning in the design and business plan, a place built according to an overall program that covered the target market, types of stores and store mix, signs, exterior lighting, and parking.

In the mid-20th century, with the rise of the suburb and automobile culture in the United States, a new style of shopping center was created away from downtown.

The Bank Block in Grandview Heights, Ohio (1928) was an early strip mall or neighborhood center of 30 shops built along Grandview Avenue, with parking in the back for 400 cars. Uniquely for the time, it had multiple national grocery store tenants Kroger, Piggly Wiggly, and the A&P Tea Company. The Park and Shop (1930) in Cleveland Park, Washington, D.C. was an early strip mall or neighborhood center with parking in the front. It was anchored by Piggly Wiggly and built in an L shape.

Other notable, large early centers with strips of independent stores, adjacent parking lots, but no department store anchors, include Highland Park Village (1931) in Dallas; and River Oaks Shopping Center (1937) in Houston.

Downtown pedestrian malls and use of term "mall"

In the late 1950s and into the 1960s, the term "shopping mall" was first used, but in the original sense of the word "mall", that is, a pedestrian promenade (in U.K. usage a "shopping precinct"). Early downtown pedestrianized malls included the Kalamazoo Mall (the first, in 1959), "Shoppers' See-Way" in Toledo, Lincoln Road Mall in Miami Beach, Santa Monica Mall (1965), and malls in Fort Worth and in Canada's capital, Ottawa. The downtown Urbana, Illinois mall, converted from a city street, was enclosed, designed by Victor Gruen.

Mall as synonym for some types of shopping centers 
Although Bergen Mall (opened 1957) led other suburban shopping centers in using "mall" in their names, these types of properties were still referred to as "shopping centers" until the late 1960s, when the term "shopping mall" started to be used generically for large suburban shopping centers.

The term "mall" for regional enclosed shopping centers is not used in the U.K.

The term "mall" is, however, used for those types of centers in some markets beyond North America such as India and the United Arab Emirates. In other developing countries such as Namibia and Zambia, "Mall" is found in the names of many small centers that qualify as neighborhood shopping centers or strip malls according to the ICSC.

Open-air centers in the U.S.

The suburban shopping center concept evolved further with larger open-air shopping centers anchored by major department stores. The first was a center in Ardmore, Pennsylvania later named Suburban Square, when the Philadelphia department store Strawbridge & Clothier opened a four-story,  branch there on May 12, 1930. A much larger example would be the  Broadway-Crenshaw Center in Los Angeles built in 1947, anchored by a five-story Broadway and a May Company California.

Two of the largest shopping centers at the time were both in the San Fernando Valley, a suburban area of Los Angeles. They each consisted of one core open-air center and surrounding retail properties with various other owners, which would later hasten their decline as there wasn't a single owner, but rather a merchants' association, which was unable to react quickly to competition in later decades. Valley Plaza opened August 12, 1951. In the mid-1950s, it claimed to be the largest shopping center on the West Coast of the United States and the third-largest in the country. The first part of the Panorama City Shopping Center opened as on October 10, 1955, and would grow until the mid-1960s, it claimed to be the first shopping center with four major department store anchors, even though the "center" was in fact a marketing association for multiple adjacent properties.

Northland Center near Detroit, built 1954, was the first of 4 centers that Victor Gruen built for Hudson's (Eastland Center, Southland Center, and Westland Center were the others) At launch, Northland Center was the world's largest shopping center.

Enclosed "malls" in the U.S.
The enclosed shopping mall did not appear until the mid-1950s. One of the earliest examples was the Valley Fair Shopping Center in Appleton, Wisconsin, which opened in March 1955. Valley Fair featured a number of modern features including central heating and cooling, a large outdoor parking area, semi-detached anchor stores, and restaurants. Later that year the world's first fully enclosed shopping mall was opened in Luleå, in northern Sweden (architect: Ralph Erskine) and was named Shopping; the region now claims the highest shopping center density in Europe.

The idea of a regionally-sized, fully enclosed shopping complex was pioneered in 1956 by the Austrian-born architect and American immigrant Victor Gruen. This new generation of regional-size shopping centers began with the Gruen-designed Southdale Center, which opened in the Twin Cities suburb of Edina, Minnesota, United States in October 1956. For pioneering the soon-to-be enormously popular mall concept in this form, Gruen has been called the "most influential architect of the twentieth century" by Malcolm Gladwell.

The first retail complex to be promoted as a "mall" was Paramus, New Jersey's Bergen Mall. The center, which opened with an open-air format in 1957, was enclosed in 1973. Aside from Southdale Center, significant early enclosed shopping malls were Harundale Mall (1958) in Glen Burnie, Maryland, Big Town Mall (1959) in Mesquite, Texas, Chris-Town Mall (1961) in Phoenix, Arizona, and Randhurst Center (1962) in Mount Prospect, Illinois.

Other early malls moved retailing away from the dense, commercial downtowns into the largely residential suburbs. This formula (enclosed space with stores attached, away from downtown, and accessible only by automobile) became a popular way to build retail across the world. Gruen himself came to abhor this effect of his new design; he decried the creation of enormous "land wasting seas of parking" and the spread of suburban sprawl.

Over the next five decades, the United States embarked on a wild shopping center construction spree. American commercial real estate developers built far more shopping centers and malls than could be justified by the country's population, retail sales, or any other economic indicator.  The number of American shopping centers exploded from 4,500 in 1960 to 70,000 by 1986 to just under 108,000 by 2010. By the time shopping mall operator Unibail-Rodamco-Westfield decided to get out of the United States in 2022, the United States had an average of 24.5 square feet of retail space per capita (in contrast to 4.5 square feet per capita in Europe).

Decline of the mall

Since the 1990s, the shopping mall has been in decline because of competition from discount stores and other shopping center formats, from e-commerce and most recently from closures and economic effects of the COVID-19 pandemic.

History of shopping centers outside the U.S.

Canada
Don Mills Convenience Centre (now Shops at Don Mills) opened in 1955, in Toronto, Ontario. The first fully enclosed shopping mall in Canada was Wellington Square. It was designed for Eaton's by John Graham, Jr. as an enclosed mall with a department store anchor and subterranean parking which opened in downtown London, Ontario, on August 11, 1960. After several renovations, it remains open today as Citi Plaza.

In the 1970s in Canada, the Ontario government created the Ontario Downtown Renewal Programme, which helped finance the building of several downtown malls across Ontario such as Eaton Centre. The program was created to reverse the tide of small business leaving downtowns for larger sites surrounding the city. In the first quarter of 2012 shopping mall private investment hit an all-time low under 0.1 percent.

United Kingdom
In the UK, Chrisp Street Market was the first pedestrian shopping area built with a road at the shop fronts. The first mall-type shopping precinct in Great Britain was built in the downtown area of Birmingham. Known as Bull Ring Centre (now Bull Ring, Birmingham), it was officially dedicated in May 1964. A notable example is the Halton Lea Shopping Centre (originally known as Shopping City) in Runcorn, which opened in 1972 and was conceived as the center point for the new town's development. Another early example is the Brent Cross Centre, Britain's first out-of-town shopping mall and located on the northern outskirts of London, which was opened in March 1976.

Australia
Chermside Drive-In Shopping Centre started trading to the public in 1957, in Brisbane, Australia.

See also

 Alley
 Arcade
 Bazaar
 Lists of shopping malls
 Mall kiosk
 Market (place)
 Retail format
 Shopping mall

References

External links

 International Council of Shopping Centers (ICSC)
 American Institute of Architects Retail and Entertainment Committee Knowledge Community

 
Planned commercial developments
Retail buildings
Urban studies and planning terminology